Michael Charles Grant, 12th Baron de Longueuil (born 1947) is a nobleman possessing the only French colonial title recognized by the Monarch of Canada, currently his second cousin twice removed, Charles III of Canada.

Assumption of title and royal connection
He assumed the title of Baron de Longueuil in 2004 upon the death of his father, Raymond Grant, in Navarrenx, near Pau, France.

He is related to the monarch of the Commonwealth realms through his grandmother, Ernestine Maude Bowes-Lyon. She was first cousin to Lady Elizabeth Bowes-Lyon, later Queen Elizabeth The Queen Mother. The baron is a second cousin, once removed, to Queen Elizabeth II.

Career, art, and residence
A medical practitioner, Grant de Longueuil has interests in palliative medicine, working for 13 years at Hayward House. His interest in pain control led him to take a degree in clinical hypnosis. Since retiring from full-time work, he has started painting. He has a studio in the South of France in Navarrenx.

He currently lives on the Isle of Arran, Scotland.

Family
Grant de Longueuil married Isabel Padua, born in the Philippines and of mixed Spanish and Filipino origin.  Together, they have three children:
Angela (born 1974), director of The Angela Grant School of Dance, London;
Rachel (born 1976), an actress and TV presenter;
Rebecca (born 1982), an actress, dancer and singer.
His second wife is Susan Casey, daughter of the BBC comedy writer and producer James Casey. They have one son:
David Alexander (born 1984), a geologist, mountaineer and expedition leader.

Family seat
The Barons de Longueuil have not lived in Canada for several generations, having lived in Scotland and France and, in the 1970s, in Luzon, Philippines.

The original seigneury was sold in the early 1800s.  The Kingston home of the barons, Alwington House, was sold out of the family in 1910.  In 1993, the current baron and his wife visited the Longueuil Castle or Ardath Castle grounds on Wolfe Island, Ontario, without making any claim to them.  Ardath Castle had been in the family as early as 1795, when the Grant family purchased lands in the area.

Ancestry

See also
 Baron de Longueuil
 Canadian Hereditary Peers
 Canadian titles debate
 City of Longueuil, Quebec, Canada

References

External links
 Site with information on the Barons de Longueuil (in French)

recognized by the Crown in right of Canada

Barons of Longueuil
Living people
1947 births
Bowes-Lyon family
British people of French descent
Le Moyne family